Today, Tomorrow, Forever may refer to:
 Today, Tomorrow, Forever (Nancy Wilson album)
 Today, Tomorrow, Forever (Corey Paul album)

See also
 Today, Tomorrow, and Forever (disambiguation)